The women's javelin throw event at the 2018 African Championships in Athletics was held on 4 August in Asaba, Nigeria.

Results

References

2018 African Championships in Athletics
Javelin throw at the African Championships in Athletics